The Men's 200 metre butterfly competition at the 2019 World Championships was held on 23 and 24 July 2019. The event was won by Kristóf Milák, who broke a 10-year-old record set by Michael Phelps, and set a new world-record time of 1:50.73 in the process.

Records
Prior to the competition, the existing world and championship records were as follows.

The following new records were set during this competition.

Results

Heats
The heats were held on 23 July at 10:45.

Semifinals
The semifinals were held on 23 July at 21:35.

Semifinal 1

Semifinal 2

Swim-off
The swim-off was held on 24 July at 10:00.

Final
The final was held on 24 July at 20:47.

References

Men's 200 metre butterfly